Elections to Langbaurgh Borough Council took place on 3 May 1979. The election took place on the same day as the 1979 UK General Election and the whole council was up for election. The Labour Party won most seats and took over control of the council from the  Conservative Party.

Election result

Ward Results

Bankside

Belmont

Brotton

Church Lane

Coatham

Dormanstown

Eston

Grangetown

Guisborough

Hutton

Kirkleatham

Lockwood

Loftus

Longbeck

Newcomen

Normanby

Ormesby

Overfields

Redcar

Saltburn

Skelton

Skinningrove

South Bank

St. Germains

Teesville

West Dyke

References

1979 English local elections
1979
1970s in North Yorkshire